This article lists all power stations in Latvia.

Non-Renewable

Thermal

Renewable

Hydroelectric 
Additional to the three major hydroelectric plants, there are approximately 150-160 operational hydroelectric plants with capacity below 5 MW each.

Wind 
There are 19 operational wind farms in Latvia with capacity above 0.25 MW and 18 wind farms with capacity below 0.25 MW.

Biogas and biomass 
There are currently a total of 23 operational biogas power stations and seven biomass power stations in Latvia. Most of them are cogeneration stations.

See also 
 List of power stations in Europe
 List of largest power stations in the world

Latvia
 
Power stations